Urganch District (Урганч тумани, ئۇرگەنچ تۇمەنى) is a district of Xorazm Region in Uzbekistan. The capital lies at the village Qorovul. The district consists of 5 urban-type settlements (Cholish, Oq oltin, Chandir, Koʻpalik, Gardonlar) and 10 rural communities (incl. Qorovul).

References

Xorazm Region
Districts of Uzbekistan